The 2011 UNAF U-23 Tournament is an association football tournament open to the Under-23 national teams of UNAF member countries. The tournament took the newly constructed Stade de Tanger in Tangier, Morocco. Of the five UNAF member countries, Libya and Tunisia chose not to participate in the competition . Instead, Niger, Saudi Arabia and Qatar were invited to the tournament. However, just days prior to the start of the competition, Egypt and Qatar withdrew from the competition.

Saudi Arabia won the competition after winning their two games against Algeria and Morocco.

Participants

Venues

Matches

Scorers
3 goals
 Mehdi Benaldjia

1 goal
 Baghdad Bounedjah
 Nabil Cheradi
 Tamim Al-Dosari
 Mosaab Al-Otaibi
 Radhwan Al-Mousa
 Hattan Bahebri
 Mohamad Majarashi

References

External links
 2011 UNAF U-23 Tournament - unaf-foot.com

2010
2011 in African football
International association football competitions hosted by Morocco
2011–12 in Moroccan football
2011–12 in Saudi Arabian football
2011–12 in Algerian football